Little Water is a small loch of southern-central Whalsay, Shetland Islands, Scotland. It is located to the north of the Loch of Livister, south of the Loch of Houll, and west of the Loch of Stanefield.

See also
 List of lochs in Scotland

References

Lochs of Whalsay